Adelocera is a genus of beetles belonging to the family Elateridae.

The genus has almost cosmopolitan distribution.
??? The species of this genus are found in Europe and Northern America.

Species:
Adelocera ami Kishii, 1996

References

Elateridae
Elateridae genera